The Samuel Paddock Strong House is a historic house at 94 West Main Street in Vergennes, Vermont.  Built in the 1830s for a prominent local businessman, it is a well-preserved example of Greek Revival architecture.  It was listed on the National Register of Historic Places in 1979.  It now houses the Strong House Inn.

Description and history
The Strong House is located southwest of downtown Vergennes, on the northwest side of West Main Street (Vermont Route 22A).  It consists of a -story main block, covered by a front-facing gabled roof, with integral flanking side-gable single-story ells.  It is a wood-frame structure, with clapboard siding and a stone foundation.  The building corners are pilastered, with a dentillated entablature encircling the main block, and a pedimented gable with triangular fan window at its center.  The main entrance is in the rightmost bay of the 3-bay facade, recessed with sidelight and transom windows in an opening framed by pilasters and an entablature.  The interior has largely been modernized, but three original fireplaces surviving, including one of locally quarried black marble.

Samuel Paddock Strong, the son of Samuel Strong, purchased the land for this house in 1832, and probably built the house not long afterward.  Its designs are based in part on the published patterns of Asher Benjamin.  Strong was the grandson of one of the area's early settlers, and achieved prominence in the community as president of the Bank of Vergennes and of the Rutland and Burlington Railroad.

See also
National Register of Historic Places listings in Addison County, Vermont

References

External links
Strong House Inn web site

Houses on the National Register of Historic Places in Vermont
National Register of Historic Places in Addison County, Vermont
Greek Revival architecture in Vermont
Houses completed in 1839
Houses in Addison County, Vermont
Buildings and structures in Vergennes, Vermont